Maria Sergeevna Kuznetsova (born 17 December 1997) is a Russian freestyle wrestler of Chuvash origin. She is a two-time bronze medalist at the European Wrestling Championships.

Career 

She competed in the 65 kg event at the 2018 European Wrestling Championships held in Kaspiysk, Russia. In that same year, she won the gold medal in her event at the 2018 Russian National Women's Freestyle Wrestling Championships.

In 2019, she represented Russia at the European Games in Minsk, Belarus and she won one of the bronze medals in the 62 kg event. A few months later, at the 2019 Military World Games held in Wuhan, China, she won the silver medal in the women's 62 kg event.

In 2019, she also won a bronze medal in the 65 kg event at the European Wrestling Championships held in Bucharest, Romania. The following year, she won a bronze medal in this event at the 2020 European Wrestling Championships held in Rome, Italy. In 2020, she also competed in the women's 65 kg event at the Individual Wrestling World Cup held in Belgrade, Serbia where she lost her bronze medal match against Mimi Hristova of Bulgaria.

In 2022, she competed at the Yasar Dogu Tournament held in Istanbul, Turkey.

Achievements

References

External links 
 

Living people
1997 births
Place of birth missing (living people)
Russian female sport wrestlers
European Wrestling Championships medalists
Wrestlers at the 2019 European Games
European Games bronze medalists for Russia
European Games medalists in wrestling
Sportspeople from Chuvashia
21st-century Russian women